St Mary's Church is a church in Ashby Magna, Leicestershire. It is a Grade II* listed building.

History
The church was built by Robert Esseby in c1220. The oldest parts of the church are the arcade and north aisle dating from the 13th century.

The church altogether is made up of a nave, vestry, 14th century tower, north aisle and chancel. In 1861 the gallery and pews were removed, the font added, and the south windows and nave were restored.

The chancel was restored in 1907 and the floor was raised. Some of the tiles have the City of Cardiff motif on them. The chancel also has an ambry recess on the north wall and a piscina.

References

Ashby Magna
Ashby Magna